Elżbieta Maria Krzesińska (née Duńska; November 11, 1934 – December 29, 2015) was a track and field athlete from Poland, who competed in the long jump. Born in  Warsaw, she competed for her native country at the 1956 Summer Olympics held in Melbourne, Australia where she won the gold medal in the Women's Long Jump.  She returned to the 1960 Summer Olympics in Rome but failed to defend her title, finishing second behind Soviet Vera Krepkina.

She won the Polish championships in Long Jump (1952, 1953, 1954, 1957, 1959, 1962, 1963), 80m Hurdles (1957), and Pentathlon (1953, 1962).
Duńska-Krzesińska participated in three Olympic Games. In 1952, she took 12th place in long jump at the 15th Olympic Games in Helsinki. In 1956, she won gold medal at the 16th Olympic Games in Melbourne. In 1960, she won silver medal, behind Vera Krepkina, at the 17th Olympic Games in Rome.

In 1954, she took 3rd, behind Jean Desforges, and Aleksandra Chudina, at the 5th European Championships in Athletics in Bern. In 1954, she won both in long jump and pentathlon at World Student Games in Budapest. In August 1956, she broke the world record in long jump (6.35) in Budapest, and equal in November 1956 in the Melbourne Olympics. In 1959, she won at the 1st Universiade in Turin. In 1962, she took 2nd, behind Tatyana Shchelkanova, at the 7th European Athletics Championships in Belgrade.

She lived in the United States of America from 1981 until 2000, then she came back to Poland. She died 29 December 2015 after long illness.

References

External links

1934 births
2015 deaths
Polish female long jumpers
Olympic gold medalists for Poland
Olympic silver medalists for Poland
Athletes (track and field) at the 1952 Summer Olympics
Athletes (track and field) at the 1956 Summer Olympics
Athletes (track and field) at the 1960 Summer Olympics
Olympic athletes of Poland
Athletes from Warsaw
European Athletics Championships medalists
Medalists at the 1956 Summer Olympics
Medalists at the 1960 Summer Olympics
Olympic gold medalists in athletics (track and field)
Olympic silver medalists in athletics (track and field)
Universiade medalists in athletics (track and field)
Skra Warszawa athletes
Universiade gold medalists for Poland
Medalists at the 1959 Summer Universiade
Medalists at the 1961 Summer Universiade